Nanchang Metro Line 1 (also known as Nanchang Rail Transit Line 1 in official documents) is the first rail transit line ever constructed in Nanchang and has opened in 2015. The Phase 1 of Line 1 runs from Shuanggang to Olympic Stadium, covered North Nanchang (Changbei), Old Town and East Nanchang (Changdong). It is planned in Phase 2 that Line 1 will be extended to Changbei Airport to the northwest and Maqiu to the east.

Introduction
Nanchang Metro Line 1 shapes like the letter 'L', its Phase 1 is 28.737 km in length and includes 24 stations. The average distance between stations is 1,251 m. The construction has begun in 2009 and was finished by 2015.

Opening timeline

Route and route map

Stations
The Phase 1 of Metro Line 1 is 28.737 km in length and includes 24 stations; further extension has been planned in Phase II.

Rolling stock
The line is operated with Type B rolling stock at a maximum speed of 80 km/h. 27 trains of 6-car set, 162 cars in total will be operated at the first stage. These cars are 2.8 m in width, 3.8 m in height and 19 m in length, providing the system with maximum capacity of 30 000 to 55 000 passenger per hour per direction, and minimum service interval of 2 minutes.

Future development
In the initial plan of 2008, Line 1 spanned from Yao Lake in the east to Lehua in the northwest, and is 35 km in length in the long-term plan, which was confirmed in June 2013 again.

 East extension: Phase 2 extends Line 1 from Olympic Stadium on the west bank of Yao Lake to Maqiu on the east bank. This extension is planned to be 4 km in length, underground, and have 2 stations.
 North extension: Phase 2 extends Line 1 to Changbei Airport via Lehua.

References

01
Railway lines opened in 2015